The House at 94 Grandview Avenue in Quincy, Massachusetts, is the best-preserved of a series of Queen Anne Victorians built on Wollaston Hill.  The -story wood-frame house was built in the 1890s, probably by Horace Briggs, a Boston businessman.   It has the complex massing and turret with conical roof that characterize the style.  A porch extends across the front, supported by grouped columns and set on a low stone balustrade, and there is a Palladian window in the gable above.

The house was listed on the National Register of Historic Places in 1989.

See also
National Register of Historic Places listings in Quincy, Massachusetts

References

Houses in Quincy, Massachusetts
Queen Anne architecture in Massachusetts
Houses completed in 1890
National Register of Historic Places in Quincy, Massachusetts
Houses on the National Register of Historic Places in Norfolk County, Massachusetts